The Salem Metropolitan Area is the fifty-sixth most populous metropolitan area in India. It is the fourth most populous metropolitan area in Tamil Nadu, only after Chennai, Coimbatore and Madurai as per 2011 census.The Salem Metropolitan Area consist of the city of Salem and its suburbs in Salem district.

Economy 

The economy of Salem is mostly influenced by Information Technology, Steel, Textile industry, Agriculture and others. Salem is most popularly known as the Steel City and Mango City of India. Gross Domestic Product (GDP) of Salem city is 12,134.10 (In Crore Rupees) and growth rate is 10.31% (YOY). It is the third largest economical district in Tamil Nadu. Salem has one special economic zone over 40 in Tamil Nadu. ELCOT has established an IT SEZ at Jagirammapalayam village in an extent of 53.33 acres of land at an investment of  40.53 crore.

Salem district also have local planning authority called Salem Local Planning Authority for development of Salem City Corporation area and Salem metropolitan area.

Salem metro 

Salem Metro is the proposed monorail system for the city of Salem, Tamil Nadu, part of a major expansion of public transport in the city. Salem city is one of the developed city in Tamil Nadu. As the monorail market is estimated to be ₹72,000 crore (US$10 billion) in India, the then Governor of Tamil Nadu S. S. Barnvarilal announced in Legislative assembly that the Government of Tamil Nadu has decided to do a feasibility study for introducing monorail system in Salem along with Coimbatore, Trichy and Madurai.

Composition 
The Salem metropolitan area is Metropolitan Area in Tamil Nadu state, consisting the city of Salem and its suburbs. It consist of Salem City Municipal Corporation and suburban areas spread over the Salem district.

New construction in areas under the Salem Local Planning Authority needs their approval to start work. And total area covered is 675.59 km2, and population is 1,774,122.

Municipal corporation 

 Salem City Municipal Corporation

Municipalities 
 Tharamangalam
Edanganasalai

Town Panchayats 
 Kannankurichi
 Mallur
 Elampillai
 Panaimarathupatti
 Ayothiapattinam
 Omalur
 Karuppur

Districts 
 Salem Metropolis
 Salem district Urban areas
 Areas covered in Salem Metropolitan Area

Panchayat Unions 
 Salem Panchayat Union
 Panaimarathupatti Panchayat Union (Full)
 Ayothiapattinam Panchayat Union (Part)
 Veerapandi Panchayat Union (Part)
 Omalur Panchayat Union (Part)
 Tharamangalam Panchayat Union (Part)
 Magudanchavadi Panchayat Union (Part)

Salem Local Planning Authority 
The Salem Local Planning Authority (SLPA) is nodal planning agency for Salem City Municipal Corporation and it's Suburbs of Indian state of Tamil Nadu. Salem Local Planning Authority administers the Salem Metropolitan Area, spread over an area of 675.59 km2. And covers the area if Salem City Municipal Corporation, 8 Town Panchayats and 7 Panchayat Unions. Total population of the area covered by Salem Local Planning Authority is 1,774,122.

See also

 Chennai metropolitan area
 Coimbatore metropolitan area
 Madurai metropolitan area
 Tiruchirappalli metropolitan area
 List of million-plus urban agglomerations in India
 List of districts in Tamil Nadu by Human Development Index
 List of urban agglomerations in Tamil Nadu
 List of neighbourhoods in Salem, Tamil Nadu
 Economy of Salem, Tamil Nadu

References 

Metropolitan areas of Tamil Nadu
Salem, Tamil Nadu
Salem, Tamil Nadu-related lists